Plymouth Township is one of the eighteen townships of Richland County, Ohio, United States.  It is a part of the Mansfield Metropolitan Statistical Area.  The 2000 census found 2,162 people in the township, 1,154 of whom lived in the unincorporated portions of the township.

Geography
Located in the northwestern corner of the county, it borders the following townships:
New Haven Township, Huron County - north
Cass Township - east
Jackson Township - southeast corner
Sharon Township - south
Vernon Township, Crawford County - southwest corner
Auburn Township, Crawford County - west

Parts of two municipalities are located in Plymouth Township: the village of Plymouth in the north, and the city of Shelby in the southeast.

Name and history
Statewide, the only other Plymouth Township is located in Ashtabula County.

Government
The township is governed by a three-member board of trustees, who are elected in November of odd-numbered years to a four-year term beginning on the following January 1. Two are elected in the year after the presidential election and one is elected in the year before it. There is also an elected township fiscal officer, who serves a four-year term beginning on April 1 of the year after the election, which is held in November of the year before the presidential election. Vacancies in the fiscal officership or on the board of trustees are filled by the remaining trustees.

References

External links
County website

Townships in Richland County, Ohio
Townships in Ohio